Tunisia (TUN) has competed at every edition of the African Games. Since its inauguration in 1965, Tunisian athletes have won a total of 763 medals.

In the 1978 All-Africa Games, Tunisia was the top country on the medal table with a total of 63 medals.

Medal tables

Medals by Games

Below is a table representing all Tunisian medals around the Games.

See also 
 Tunisia at the Olympics
 Tunisia at the Paralympics
 Tunisia at the Mediterranean Games
 Sports in Tunisia

References

External links 
 African Games index - todor66.com